The Caroline Bancroft House is a historic house in Denver, Colorado. It was listed on the National Register of Historic Places on August 29, 1990. The house named for Caroline Bancroft, who was born there in 1900 and wrote about Colorado history from 1929 to 1968. She lived in the house until 1975.

References

		
National Register of Historic Places in Denver
Queen Anne architecture in Colorado
Houses completed in 1892